Noppadol Sangnil (born July 9, 1977) is a Thai former professional snooker player. He first entered the professional tour for the 2001–02 season, but dropped off at the end of the year. He returned in 2009–10, but once again lasted only one season.

Career finals

Pro-am finals: 1

Amateur finals: 3 (1 title)

References

External links
 Player profiel on World Snooker

1977 births
Living people
Noppadol Sangnil
Cue sports players at the 2002 Asian Games
Noppadol Sangnil
Southeast Asian Games medalists in cue sports
Competitors at the 2007 Southeast Asian Games
Noppadol Sangnil
Noppadol Sangnil